Sundown was a gothic metal band formed by Mathias Lodmalm and Johnny Hagel. It was disbanded when Mathias Lodmalm reformed Cemetary together with Christian Silver and Herman Engström. All of Sundown's albums were released by Century Media Records.

Discography 
 Aluminum EP (1997)
 Design 19 (1997)
 Halo (1999)
 Glimmer (1999)

Members 
 Mathias Lodmalm
 Johnny Hagel
 Andreas Karlsson
 Andreas Johansson
 Herman Engström

References

External links
MusicMight

Swedish musical groups
Century Media Records artists